Daniel Boulanger  (24 January 1922 – 27 October 2014) was a French novelist, playwright, poet and screenwriter. He has also played secondary roles in films and was a member of the Académie Goncourt from 1983 until his death. He was born in Compiègne, Oise.

Boulanger is most known for his roles as the detective hunting down Jean-Paul Belmondo in Jean-Luc Godard's Breathless, the neighbor of Claude Jade and Jean-Pierre Léaud in François Truffaut's Bed and Board and as a comical gangster in Shoot the Piano Player, another Truffaut feature. On 27 October 2014, Boulanger died at the age of 92.

Filmography
1960: À bout de souffle (by Jean-Luc Godard) - Police Inspector Vital
1960: Les Jeux de l'amour (by Philippe de Broca) - Un danseur au cabaret / l'homme à la Citroën
1960: Le Farceur (by Philippe de Broca) - Un musicien (uncredited)
1960: Tirez sur le pianiste (by François Truffaut) - Ernest
1961: L'Amant de cinq jours (by Philippe de Broca) (Writer)
1962: L'Œil du malin (by Claude Chabrol) - Policeman
1966: Le Roi de cœur (by Philippe de Broca) (Writer) - Le Colonel Helmut von Krack 
1967: The Oldest Profession (Writer)
1968: La Mariée était en noir (by François Truffaut) - Delvaux
1970: Domicile conjugal (by François Truffaut) - Le voisin ténor
1970: Sortie de secours (by Roger Kahane)
1971: The Married Couple of the Year Two (by Jean-Paul Rappeneau) (Writer)
1971: The Deadly Trap (by René Clément) (Writer)
1974: Toute une vie (by Claude Lelouch) - The general
1976: Une femme fidèle (by Roger Vadim) (Writer)
1978: La Zizanie (by Claude Zidi) - Le directeur du Crédit Agricole (final film role)
1980: Le cheval d'orgueil (by Claude Chabrol) (Writer)

Award and distinctions
1971 Prix de l'Académie française
1974 Prix Goncourt de la Nouvelle, Fouette, cocher !
1979 Prix Prince Pierre de Monaco
1983 llamado a l'Académie Goncourt

References

External links

 bibliographie
 Daniel Boulanger alongside Jean-Pierre Leaud and Claude Jade in Truffaut's "Bed and Board"
 Daniel Boulanger as neighbor in "Domicile conjugal"

1922 births
2014 deaths
People from Compiègne
French male screenwriters
French screenwriters
20th-century French novelists
20th-century French male writers
21st-century French novelists
20th-century French poets
21st-century French poets
21st-century French male writers
20th-century French dramatists and playwrights
20th-century French male actors
French children's writers
Prix Sainte-Beuve winners
Prix du Livre Inter winners
Prix Goncourt de la nouvelle recipients
French male short story writers
French short story writers